Gen. Asahel Stone Mansion is a historic home located at Winchester, Randolph County, Indiana.  It was built in 1872, and is a -story, Second Empire style brick dwelling. It has a mansard roof and wraparound porch.  It features a three-story, square tower with a low hipped roof.

It was added to the National Register of Historic Places in 1978.

References

Houses on the National Register of Historic Places in Indiana
Second Empire architecture in Indiana
Houses completed in 1872
Buildings and structures in Randolph County, Indiana
National Register of Historic Places in Randolph County, Indiana
1872 establishments in Indiana
Winchester, Indiana